Andamanese may refer to:
anything from, or related to, the Andaman Islands, an archipelago in the Indian Ocean
Andamanese peoples, the various indigenous peoples of the islands
Andamanese languages, several indigenous language families of the islands

See also 
Great Andamanese